Janet Strayer is a former German curler.

Teams

References

External links
 

Living people
German female curlers
German curling champions
Year of birth missing (living people)